Trinity University may refer to:
 Leeds Trinity University, Leeds, England, UK
 Trinity University (Texas), in (Midtown) San Antonio, Texas, USA
 Trinity University of Asia, formerly known as Trinity College of Quezon City, Quezon City, Philippines
 Trinity International University, Deerfield, Illinois, USA
 Trinity Washington University, Washington, DC, USA
 Trinity Western University, Langley, British Columbia, Canada
 University of Trinity College, Toronto, Ontario, Canada
 Bronte International University, formerly known as Trinity College & University, Tortola, British Virgin Islands

See also
 Trinity College (disambiguation)